The Carolina Panthers joined the National Football League (NFL) in 1995 as the league's 29th franchise. Their first ever selection was Kerry Collins, a quarterback from Penn State, in the 1995 NFL Draft. The team's most recent first-round selection (6th pick overall) was Ikem Ekwonu, an offensive tackle from NC State, in the 2022 NFL Draft.

Every year during April, each NFL franchise seeks to add new players to its roster through a collegiate draft officially known as "the NFL Annual Player Selection Meeting" but more commonly known as the NFL Draft. Teams are ranked in inverse order based on the previous season's record, with the worst record picking first, and the second worst picking second and so on. The two exceptions to this order are made for teams that appeared in the previous Super Bowl; the Super Bowl champion always picks 32nd, and the Super Bowl loser always picks 31st. Teams have the option of trading away their picks to other teams for different picks, players, cash, or a combination thereof. Thus, it is not uncommon for a team's actual draft pick to differ from their assigned draft pick, or for a team to have extra or no draft picks in any round due to these trades. 
 
The Panthers' only first overall selection came in 2011, when they selected quarterbakc Cam Newton out of Auburn.  They would have picked first in 2002, however, the inception of the Houston Texans that year allowed Houston to pick first instead of Carolina. Carolina had the first overall pick in their inaugural season, but traded the pick to the Cincinnati Bengals for the 5th and 36th overall selection. The Panthers have twice selected a Miami Hurricanes player in the first round: linebackers Dan Morgan in 2001 and Jon Beason in 2007.

Collins, the team's first ever selection, made the Pro Bowl and led the Panthers to the playoffs in only their second season of existence, but he was later released after struggling on and off the field with alcoholism. Rae Carruth began his career as a promising wide receiver, but he was dropped from the team after being arrested for hiring someone to kill his pregnant girlfriend (he would later be convicted of the crime). Julius Peppers won Rookie of the Year, was named to the Pro Bowl on several occasions, and was the centerpiece of the Panthers' defensive line until signing with the Chicago Bears.  Dan Morgan was also a highly touted Pro Bowl linebacker, but repeated concussions had caused him to miss parts of several seasons until the Panthers released him in 2008. The Panthers drafted Jon Beason in 2007 partially to insure their defense against Morgan's absence. Newton threw for 422 yards in his debut game, an NFL record, went on to set several passing records as a rookie, and won the AP Offensive Rookie of the Year award. Luke Kuechly led the NFL in tackles his rookie year, and won the AP Defensive Rookie of the Year award one year after Newton's offensive ROTY.

When the Panthers and Jacksonville Jaguars joined the league together in 1995, both teams participated in an expansion draft, where they selected players from 30 existing NFL teams.  This list does not include players selected in that draft.

Key

Player selections

Notes
Notes

Footnotes

References 

 

Carolina Panthers

First round draft picks